Frederick Robinson (August 7, 1799 – January 22, 1882) served  as sheriff of Essex County, Massachusetts, and as the President of the Massachusetts Senate.

Family life
Robinson married Mary Hutton.

Business career
Early on in life Robinson was engaged in the trade of shoe making, he later became a self taught lawyer.

Political career
Robinson served as the Sheriff Essex County, Massachusetts, in the Massachusetts House of Representatives, and he was a member, and the president of, the Massachusetts Senate.

Legislative accomplishments
While a member of the Massachusetts House of Representatives Robinson wrote and introduced the bill, An Act to Abolish Imprisonment for Debt that was enacted, and came into effect on July 4, 1834. Robinson was also instrumental in passing legislation that ended special pleadings in Massachusetts' Courts of Justice.

Campaign for Governor
In 1847 Robinson was an unsuccessful Democratic party candidate for the US House of Representatives.

Other government service
Robinson was the Warden of the Massachusetts State Prison.

See also
 64th Massachusetts General Court (1843)

Notes

1799 births
1882 deaths
People from Marblehead, Massachusetts
Massachusetts lawyers
Democratic Party members of the Massachusetts House of Representatives
Democratic Party Massachusetts state senators
Presidents of the Massachusetts Senate
Sheriffs of Essex County, Massachusetts
19th-century American politicians
19th-century American lawyers